Charles-Émile-Callande de Champmartin (1797 in Bourges – 1883 in Paris) was a French painter, noted for his Orientalist works.

Life and career
The son of a couple of freeholders, Jean Callande and Gabrielle Lemonnier, Charles-Émile Callande de Champmartin began exhibiting at the Salon in 1819. He owes his reputation to his many portraits and religious paintings, treated with a brush of romantic sensitivity. He was one of the early painters to travel to the Middle East and produce paintings with Orientalist themes. His is known for his numerous portraits, historical and religious paintings and Orientalist works, all of which were very popular during his lifetime.

He was a friend and pupil of Eugène Delacroix, of whom he made a portrait (1840), now preserved in Paris at the Musée Carnavalet. A portrait of Eugène Sue is in the Magnin museum in Dijon with three other paintings by the same author. Five paintings are at the Louvre Museum in Paris and four others at the National Museum of the Castles of Versailles and Trianon, including a portrait of Marshal Clausel (1835).

Select list of paintings

 Massacre of the Janissaries, 1827 (now in Rochefort Museum, Munich)
 Portrait of Eugene Sue, oil on canvas
 The Sacrifice of Abraham
 Dog keeping a dead rabbit
 Portrait of lady in flower cap 
 Portrait of Juliette Drouet as a woman of Smyrna, 1827.
 Portrait of Paul-Émile Botta, orientalist, 1840, oil on canvas, now in the Louvre

Gallery

See also
 List of Orientalist artists
 Orientalism

References

 This article includes text translated from the French Wikipedia

Further reading
 Flemming Friborg, Catalogue French Painting in the 19th Century NY, Carlsberg Glyptotek, 1994

1797 births
1883 deaths
19th-century French painters
French male painters
Orientalist painters
19th-century French male artists